Fierasfer is a common name for several fishes and may refer to:

Carapus species

Fish common names